Albert Geoffrey Bayldon (7 January 1924 – 10 May 2017) was an English actor. After playing roles in many stage productions, including the works of William Shakespeare, he became known for portraying the title role of the children's series Catweazle (1969–70). Bayldon's other long-running parts include the Crowman in Worzel Gummidge (1979–81) and Magic Grandad in the BBC television series Watch (1995).

Early life
Bayldon was born in Leeds and attended Bridlington School and Hull College of Architecture. Following service in the Royal Air Force during World War II, he appeared in amateur theatricals and then trained at the Old Vic Theatre School.

Career
Bayldon enjoyed a substantial stage career, including work in the West End and for the RSC. He made several film appearances in the 1960s and 1970s, including King Rat (1965), To Sir, with Love (1967), Casino Royale (as Q) (1967), the Envy segment of The Magnificent Seven Deadly Sins (1971), the Marc Bolan/T. Rex film Born to Boogie (1972), The Pink Panther Strikes Again (1976), as well as the film versions of Steptoe and Son, Steptoe and Son Ride Again (1973) as the vicar, and Porridge (1979) as the Prison Governor.

Bayldon also appeared in several horror films; Dracula and Frankenstein Must Be Destroyed for Hammer Films and The House That Dripped Blood, Asylum and Tales from the Crypt for Amicus. In 2004, after many years of successful television work he appeared in the film Ladies in Lavender.

He appeared in Doctor Who with a guest appearance as Organon in The Creature from the Pit (1979) opposite Tom Baker as the Fourth Doctor. Subsequently, he played an alternative First Doctor in two audio plays based on the Doctor Who television series by Big Finish Productions in the Doctor Who Unbound series: Auld Mortality (2003) and A Storm of Angels (2005). In 1963, Bayldon had been one of the first actors offered the role of the Doctor.

Bayldon's other television roles include, ITV Play of the Week (1957, 1959, 1964, 1967), The Avengers (1961 and 1967), Z-Cars (1963, 1968), Theatre 625 (1964–1968), The Wednesday Play (1968, 1969), ITV Sunday Night Theatre (1970, 1972), Space: 1999 (1976), The Tomorrow People (1976), Tales of the Unexpected (1980, 1983), Blott on the Landscape (1985), Star Cops (1987), Rumpole of the Bailey (1987), The Chronicles of Narnia (1989). He later took part in a number of BBC Schools programmes, where he displayed a number of otherwise unexploited talents (such as singing). In 1993, he played Simplicio in the Open University video Newton's Revolution.

In 1986, Bayldon provided the vocals on Paul Hardcastle's "The Wizard" which was also used (without the vocal) as the theme for BBC1's Top of the Pops.

Among his later television appearances were the Five game show Fort Boyard (1998–2001), Waking the Dead (2004), Heartbeat (2004) and Casualty (2006, after previous appearances in 1991, 1997 and 2004). His final television appearances, before his retirement, were New Tricks (2007) and My Family (2010).

Death
Bayldon died on 10 May 2017, aged 93, from undisclosed causes. He was predeceased by his partner, actor Alan Rowe, who died in 2000.

TV and film credits

 The Stranger Left No Card (1952) as Hotel - Receptionist
 Trent's Last Case (1952) as Reporter in Court (uncredited)
 Sword of Freedom TV series (Episode, The Ship, 1957) as The Physician
 Sword of Freedom TV series (Episode, The Lion and the Mouse, 1957) as Luigi
 Sword of Freedom TV series (Episode, A Choice of Weapons, 1957) as Muzio
 OSS TV series (Episode, Operation Dagger, 1957) as Abwehr Lieutenant 
 The Adventures of Robin Hood TV series (Episode, The Angry Village, 1957) as Cal
 The Adventures of Robin Hood TV series (Episode, The Genius, 1958) as Count De Severne
 The Camp on Blood Island (1958) as Foster – New Prisoner (uncredited)
 Dracula (1958) as Porter
 A Night to Remember (1958) as Wireless Operator Cyril Evans – Californian
 The Two-Headed Spy (1958) as Dietz
 Whirlpool (1959) as Wendel
 Idol on Parade (1959) as Record Producer. (uncredited)
 The Rough and the Smooth (1959) as Ransom
 Libel (1959) as Second Photographer
 Cone of Silence (1960) as Aircraft Controller (uncredited)
 The Day They Robbed the Bank of England (1960) as The Bombardier bartender (uncredited)
 An Age of Kings (miniseries, 1960) as Edmund of York / Worcester / Chief Justice
 Man from Interpol (Episode, The International Diamond Incident, 1960) as Freddie
 Suspect (1960) as Rosson
 You Can't Win TV series (Episode, Epitaph on a Tin, 1961) as Mr Wishart
 The Avengers (Episode, The Deadly Air, 1961) as Professor Kilbride
 Greyfriars Bobby (1961) as The Vicar (uncredited)
 Disneyland (Episode, The Prince and the Pauper: The Pauper King, 1962) as Sir Goeffrey
 The Winter's Tale (1962) as Antigonus
 The Webster Boy (1962) as Charlies Jamieson
 Jigsaw (1962) as Constable at Murder Scene (uncredited)
 The Longest Day (1962) as Officer at Eisenhower Briefing (uncredited)
 The Amorous Prawn (1962) as 2nd Telephone – Operator
 55 Days at Peking (1963) as Smythe
 Z-Cars (Alarm Call, 1963) as Blake
 Bomb in the High Street (1963) as Clay
 Becket (1964) as Brother Philip (uncredited)
 Detective (End of Chapter, 1964) as Stephen Protheroe
 The Saint (The Scorpion, 1964) as Wilfred Garniman
 Ghost Squad (Rich Ruby Wine, 1964) as Hartmann
 The Massingham Affair (6 episodes, 1964) as Mr Lumley
 Danger Man (A Very Dangerous Game, 1965) as Dickinson
 Play of the Month (Luther, 1965) as Cajetan
 King Rat (1965) as Squadron Leader Vexley
 Life at the Top (1965) as Industrial Psychologist
 Sky West and Crooked (1966) as Rev. Phillip Moss
 Theatre 625 (The Family Reunion, 1966)
 Where the Spies Are (1966) as Lecturer
 The Saint (The Art Collectors, 1967) as Marcel Legrand
 Theatre 625 (Incantation of Casanova, 1967) as Don Antonio Capitani
 The Avengers (Escape in Time, 1967) as Clapham
 Casino Royale (1967) as Q
 Theatre 625 (Kittens Are Brave, 1967) as Gordon Shiplake
 To Sir, with Love (1967) as Theo Weston
 Two a Penny (1968) as Alec Fitch
 Theatre 625 (To See How Far It Is, 1968) as Palmer
 Assignment K (1968) as The Boffin
 Inspector Clouseau (1968) as Gutch
 A Dandy in Aspic (1968) as Lake
 The Wednesday Play as Mr Mileson ("A Night with Mrs Da Tanka", 1968)
 The First Lady ("King of Furness", 1968) as Albert Craig
 Play of the Month (Saint Joan, 1968) as Archbishop of Rheims
 Z-Cars (Breakdown: Part 1 & 2, 1968) as Mr Smayles
 Otley (1968) as Inspector Hewett
 The Wednesday Play ("A Child and a Half", 1969) as Henry Ramsden
 Frankenstein Must Be Destroyed (1969) as Police Doctor
 Journey to the Unknown (1969) as Mr Plimmer (Episode "The Last Visitor")
 Special Branch ("The Promised Land", 1969) as Alex Rushmer
 The Bushbaby (1969) as Tilison
 Prisoners of the Sun (1969) as Calculus (English version, voice only, uncredited)
 Codename (Opening Gambit, 1970) as Blair
 Danton (1970) as Couthon
 Scrooge (1970) as Pringle
 Say Hello to Yesterday (1971) as Makelaar, Estate Agent
 The Raging Moon (1971) as Mr Latbury
 The House That Dripped Blood (1971) as Theo Von Hartmann (segment 4, "The Cloak")
 Catweazle (26 episodes, 1970–1971) as Catweazle
 Play of the Month (Platonov''', 1971) as Sergei Voinitsev
 The Magnificent Seven Deadly Sins (1971) as Vernon (segment "Envy")
 Tales from the Crypt (1972) as Guide
 Van der Valk ("Blue Notes", 1972) as Joseph Kettner
 Au Pair Girls (1972) as Mr Howard
 Asylum (1972) as Max (segment: "Mannikins of Horror")
 Born To Boogie (1972) as Waiter
 The Adventures of Black Beauty (The Viking Helmet: Parts 1 & 2, 1972) as Professor Miles
 The Strauss Family (Revolution, 1972) as Schlumberger
 The Pathfinders ("Unusual Ally", 1973) as Dr Pers Anderson
 Special Branch ("All the King's Men", 1973) as Sumner
 Gawain and the Green Knight (1973) as Wiseman
 Steptoe and Son Ride Again (1973) as Vicar
 Armchair Theatre ("That Sinking Feeling", 1973) as Uncle Norman
 Orson Welles Great Mysteries (The Ingenious Reporter, 1973) as Magistrate
 Napoleon and Love (miniseries, 1974) as Prince van Mecklenburg
 Alice Through the Looking-Glass (television film, 1974) as White Knight
 Comedy Playhouse (Franklyn and Johnnie, 1974) as Franklyn Sims
 Play of the Month ("The Wood Demon", 1974) as Dyadin
 Crown Court ("The Murder Monitor", 1975)
 Edward the King (miniseries, 1975) as Sir Henry Campbell-Bannerman
 The Slipper and the Rose (1976) as Archbishop
 Space: 1999 – Number Eight ("One Moment of Humanity", 1976)
 BBC2 Playhouse (The Mind Beyond: The Man with the Power, 1976) as Mr Smythe
 The Pink Panther Strikes Again (1976) as Dr. Claude Duval
 Charleston (1977) as Uncle Fred
 Just William (1977 TV series) ("William's Lucky Day", 1977) as Great Man
 The Duchess of Duke Street ("Shadows", 1977) as Collinghurst
 Sky Hunter (1978) as Mr Charles Trim
 The Famous Five ("Five Go to Billycock Hill", 1978) as Mr Gringle
 All Creatures Great and Small ("Pride of Possession", 1978) as Roland Partridge
 Worzel Gummidge (1979–81) as The Crowman
 Porridge (1979) as the Prison Governor
 Doctor Who- Organon ("The Creature from the Pit", 1979)
 Cribb (Something Old, Something New, 1980) as Oom Ezra Winter
 Sherlock Holmes and Doctor Watson ("The Case of the Deadly Tower", 1980) as Hadlock
 Tales of the Unexpected ("Fat Chance", 1980) as Dr Applegate
 The Monster Club (1981) as Psychiatrist
 Lady Killers (My Perfect Husband, 1981) as Dr. French
 Juliet Bravo ("Journeys", 1981) as Jack Lord 
 Bergerac ("Relative Values", 1981) as Henry Bernard
 Tales of the Unexpected ("Down Among the Sheltering Palms", 1983) as Sid
 Hallelujah! ("Counselling" and "Luncheon Club", both 1983) as Mr Sedgewick
 Bullshot (1983) as Colonel Hinchcliff
 All Creatures Great and Small 1983 Christmas special (television film, 1983) as Mr Mason
 Hallelujah! (A Goose for Mrs Scratchit, 1984) as Jacob Marley
 Blott on the Landscape (miniseries, 1985) as Ganglion
 Hold the Back Page ("Fathers, Sons and Lovers", 1985)
 In Loving Memory ("Up in the World", 1986) as Balloonist 
 All Passion Spent (television film, 1986) as William
 Cause célèbre (television film, 1987) as Humphreys
 Rumpole of the Bailey ("Rumpole and the Judge's Elbow", 1987) as Brinsley Lampitt
 Star Cops ("Other People's Secrets", 1987) as Ernest Wolfhartt
 The Storyteller ("Sapsorrow", 1988) as Koning
 Madame Sousatzka (1988) as Mr Cordle
 The Tenth Man (television film, 1988)
 Dramarama (The Pisces Connection, 1989) as Visser
 All Creatures Great and Small ("Where Sheep May Safely Graze", 1989) as Geoff Hatfield
 Prince Caspian and the Voyage of the Dawn Treader (television film, 1989) as Ramandu
 Campion – Rev Swithin Cush ("Mystery Mile: Part 1", 1990)
 Van der Valk ("The Little Rascals", 1991) as Nicolas Meijers 
 l'Amore necessario (1991) as Bernardo
 Casualty (Facing Up, 1991) as Duncan Frain
 Soldier Soldier (Further Education, 1994) as Jack Knight
 Tom & Viv (1994) as Harwent
 Asterix in America (1994) as Getafix (English version, voice)
 Magic Grandad (1995) as Magic Grandad
 Last of the Summer Wine ("Adopted by a Stray", 1995) as Mr Broadbent
 Wycliffe ("Wild Oats", 1995) as Gilbert Rawle
 Pie in the Sky ("Black Pudding", 1995) as Seymour Flint
 The Biz (1995, TV Series) as Markov
 Faith in the Future ("Art Lovers", 1996) as Mr. Quigley
 Casualty ("Déjà Vu", 1997) as Alby James 
 Casualty ("A Taste of Freedom", 1997) as James Ellington
 Wycliffe ("Old Crimes, New Times", 1997) as Rechter
 Heat of the Sun (miniseries, 1998) as Rafe Goodwin
 Heartbeat ("Spellbound", 1998) as Follett
 Peak Practice ("Once in a Lifetime" and "A Change of View", both 1998) as Alby James
 Where the Heart Is ("Love", 1998) as Edward Smith
 Asterix & Obelix Take On Caesar (1999) as Additional voice (voice, uncredited)
 Midsomer Murders (Blue Herrings, 2000) as Arthur Prewitt
 Where the Heart Is ("Relative Strangers", 2002) as Wally Vernon
 Fort Boyard (1998–2001) as Professor
 Looking for Victoria (television film, 2003) as Sir Henry Ponsonby
 Ladies in Lavender (2004) as Mr Penhaligan
 Waking the Dead (In Sight of the Lord, 2004) as Edward Atkinson
 Casualty ("Inside Out", 2004) as Ralph Michaels
 Heartbeat ("Money, Money, Money", 2004) as Gilbert Percy
 Casualty ("Needle", 2006) as Wilf Simpson
 New Tricks ("God's Waiting Room", 2007) as Leonard Casey
 My Family (The Son'll Come Out'', 2010) as Joe (final appearance)

References

External links

 Obituary in the Guardian newspaper
 The Official Catweazle Fan Club
 Geoffrey Bayldon at the British Film Institute
 

1924 births
2017 deaths
20th-century English LGBT people
21st-century English LGBT people
English male stage actors
English male film actors
English male television actors
English gay actors
English LGBT actors
Male actors from Yorkshire
Male actors from Leeds
People educated at Bridlington School
Royal Air Force personnel of World War II